The 2004 World Junior Curling Championships were held in Trois-Rivières, Quebec, Canada from 20 March 2004 to 28 March 2004. The venue was the Colisée de Trois-Rivières.

Men

Round Robin Standings
Final Round Robin Standings

Tiebreaker
 7–4

Playoffs

Women

Round Robin Standings
Final Round Robin Standings

Playoffs

External links

J
C
World Junior Curling Championships
Sport in Trois-Rivières
Curling competitions in Quebec
2004 in Quebec
International curling competitions hosted by Canada
2004 in youth sport